The pink velvet bean (Pseudarthria hookeri, named after William Hooker) is a lanky, perennial Afrotropical herb in the legume family, Fabaceae. It is widespread in the African tropics and moist uplands of the African subtropics, from Senegal and Ethiopia southwards to eastern South Africa. It bears rough trifoliolate leaves along the stem, and produces terminal, pink flowers in late summer. The stem may grow up to 2 or 3 meters in height annually, before it dies back in the dry season.

References

External links
 Pseudarthria hookeri var. hookeri, Flora of Mozambique
 Pseudarthria hookeri West African Plants

Desmodieae